Tupou VI (born 12 July 1959) is the King of Tonga. He is the younger brother and successor of the late King George Tupou V. He was officially confirmed by his brother on 27 September 2006 as the heir presumptive to the Throne of Tonga, as his brother (a bachelor) had no legitimate children. He served as Tonga's High Commissioner to Australia, and resided in Canberra until the death of King George Tupou V on 18 March 2012, when ʻAhoʻeitu ʻUnuakiʻotonga Tukuʻaho became King of Tonga, with the regnal name Tupou VI.

Life 
He was born in Nukuʻalofa, Tonga, the third son and youngest child of King Tāufaʻāhau Tupou IV. He was educated at The Leys School, Cambridge, from 1973 to 1977. He then attended the University of East Anglia, where he read Development Studies, from 1977 to 1980. He started his career in the military, joining the naval arm of the Tonga Defence Services in 1982 and becoming a Lieutenant-Commander in 1987. He graduated from the US Naval War College as part of Class 33 in 1988. From 1990 to 1995 he commanded the Pacific-class patrol boat VOEA Pangai and his time in charge included peacekeeping operations in Bougainville. He graduated from the University of New South Wales in 1997 with a master's degree in defence studies and from Bond University in 1999 with a master's degree in international relations.

In 1998 he ended his military career to become part of the government, first as simultaneous defence minister and foreign minister from October 1998 until August 2004. He took over these posts from his elder brother Tupoutoʻa, at that time still the crown prince, later to become King Siaosi Tupou V (see below). He was later appointed as Prime Minister on 3 January 2000, a function he kept until his sudden resignation on 11 February 2006. The reason has never been made clear, but was likely connected to pro-democracy protests calling since mid-2005 for a lesser role of the royal family in government, later culminating in the 2006 Nukuʻalofa riots. His appointed successor, Feleti Sevele, was Tonga's first prime minister who was not a hereditary estate holder or a member of the 33 noble families that make up the Tongan aristocracy.

In 2008 ʻAhoʻeitu was appointed Tonga's first High Commissioner to Australia, a post he held until his succession to the Tongan throne in 2012. In addition, he was also non-resident Ambassador to Japan from 15 January 2010 to his succession in 2012. In 2013 he was appointed as Chancellor of the University of the South Pacific.

On 15 January 2022, he was evacuated from the Royal Palace after the Hunga Tonga–Hunga Ha'apai eruption and tsunami. He returned to the palace on 17 January.

Marriage and family 

ʻAhoʻeitu is married to a daughter of the high chief Vaea, Nanasipauʻu Tukuʻaho (his second cousin) and the couple have three children and four grandchildren:
 Princess Lātūfuipeka Tukuʻaho – ʻAngelika Lātūfuipeka Halaʻevalu Mataʻaho Napuaʻokalani Tukuʻaho (17 November 1983)  She followed her father's steps to be the current High Commissioner to Australia since 22 August 2012.
 Crown Prince Tupoutoʻa ʻUlukalala – Siaosi Manumataongo ʻAlaivahamamaʻo ʻAhoʻeitu Konstantin Tukuʻaho (17 September 1985, Nukuʻalofa). He married on 12 July 2012 Sinaitakala Fakafanua, his second cousin. They have four children: Prince Taufaʻahau Manumataongo – Taufaʻahau Manumataongo Tukuʻaho (born 10 May 2013 at Auckland City Hospital in Auckland), Princess Halaevalu Mata'aho (born 12 July 2015, Auckland City Hospital in Auckland), Princess Nanasipau’u (born 20 March 2018, Auckland Hospital in Auckland) and Princess Salote Mafile’o Pilolevu (born 25 February 2021, Calvary Hospital in Canberra).
 Prince Ata – Viliami ʻUnuaki-ʻo-Tonga Mumui Lalaka-Mo-e-ʻEiki Tukuʻaho (Nukuʻalofa, 27 April 1988).

Since his confirmation as heir presumptive, he got the traditional title of Tupoutoʻa, reserved for crown princes, which his older brother (the second) had to give up because he married a commoner, while two of his previous titles went to his sons. As such he was until his accession to the throne known as Tupoutoʻa Lavaka. His elder son, Siaosi, (George) is to be addressed by the prestigious title of ʻUlukālala of Fangatongo, while his second son, Viliami, (William) was bestowed with ʻAta of Hihifo.

Coronation 

King Tupou VI and Queen Nanasipau’u were crowned in a ceremony conducted at Centenary Church in Nukuʻalofa on 4 July 2015 by the Reverend D'Arcy Wood, a retired Uniting Church in Australia minister who was born in Tonga. He was assisted by the Reverend 'Ahio and the Reverend Tevita Havea, the president and the secretary general of the Free Wesleyan Church of Tonga. The celebrations included many international invited guests, and an estimated 15,000 people, mostly expatriate Tongans, flew in to join the celebrations.

During the ceremony, Tupou VI was anointed with holy oil, adorned with a ring, and presented with a sceptre. The crown was then placed on his head by Wood, who performed the anointing and crowning as a matter of circumventing the taboo on native Tongans touching the King's head. The celebrations ran for a total of eleven days, beginning a week before the ceremony.

Honours

National 
 : 
 Sovereign Knight Grand Cross with Collar of the Order of Pouono
 Sovereign Knight Grand Cross of the Order of George Tupou I
 Sovereign Knight Grand Cross with Collar of the Order of the Crown
 Sovereign Knight Grand Cross with Collar of the Order of Sālote Tupou III
 Sovereign Knight Grand Cross of the Order of Saint George
 Sovereign Knight Grand Cross of the Order of the Phoenix
 Sovereign Knight Grand Cross of the Order of the Royal House
 Sovereign Knight Grand Cross of the Royal Order of Oceania

Decorations 
 : King Taufa’ahau Tupou IV Coronation Silver Jubilee Medal (4 July 1992)
 : King George Tupou V Coronation Medal (31 July 2008)
 : Tonga Defence Services General Service (Bougainville) Medal (4 July 1995)
 : Tonga Defence Services Long Service and Good Conduct Medal

Family tree

See also 
 Line of succession to the Tongan throne
 List of national leaders

References

External links 

 
 Government Biography

|-

|-

|-

|-

1959 births
Living people
Alumni of the University of East Anglia
Bond University alumni
Government ministers of Tonga
High Commissioners of Tonga to Australia
Ambassadors of Tonga to Japan
People educated at The Leys School
Prime Ministers of Tonga
Tongan monarchs
University of New South Wales alumni
People from Nukuʻalofa
Foreign ministers of Tonga